Justyna Święty-Ersetic (born 3 December 1992) is a Polish sprinter specialising in the 400 metres. She was the 2018 European champion and a two-time European Indoor Championship medallist in this event. Święty-Ersetic won many medals at major championships as part of Polish 4 × 400 m relays, including a gold in the mixed relay and a silver in the women's relay at the 2020 Tokyo Olympics.

She is multiple Polish national outdoor and indoor champion.

Career
Justyna Święty-Ersetic competed in the 4 × 400 metres relay at the 2012, 2016 Summer Olympics. She also won a bronze medal at the 2017 World Championships in the same event. At the 2018 European Championships in Berlin, she won an individual gold and later also anchored the Polish squad to the win despite the fact that both finals were separated by less than two hours.

At the 2020 Tokyo Olympics she represented Poland in the 4 x 400 m mixed relay, winning gold alongside Karol Zalewski, Natalia Kaczmarek and Kajetan Duszyński. A few days later, Święty-Ersetic anchored the women's 4 × 400 m relay team of Kaczmarek, Iga Baumgart-Witan and Małgorzata Hołub-Kowalik, sealing a silver for the group.

In March 2022, Święty-Ersetic won for the second time World Athletics Indoor Tour in her specialist distance after 2020 victory, breaking a meeting record in Madrid.

Her personal bests in the 400 metres are 50.41 seconds outdoors (Berlin 2018), and 51.04 seconds indoors (Polish national record, Toruń 2022). She was part of teams which set national records for the women's and mixed 4 x 400m relay (both Tokyo 2021), and women's indoor 4 x 400m relay (Birmingham 2018).

Personal bests
 200 metres – 23.81 (+0.4 m/s, Inowrocław 2014)
 400 metres – 50.41 (Berlin 2018)
 400 metres indoor – 51.04 (Toruń 2022)
Relays
 4 × 400 metres relay – 3:20.53 (Tokyo 2021) 
 4 × 400 metres relay indoor – 3:26.09 (Birmingham 2018) 
 4 × 400 metres relay mixed – 3:09.87 (Tokyo 2021) European record

Competition record

Personal life
In September 2017, she married Polish wrestler Dawid Ersetic.

References

External links

People from Racibórz
Polish female sprinters
1992 births
Living people
Olympic athletes of Poland
Athletes (track and field) at the 2012 Summer Olympics
Athletes (track and field) at the 2016 Summer Olympics
Athletes (track and field) at the 2020 Summer Olympics
Medalists at the 2020 Summer Olympics
Olympic gold medalists in athletics (track and field)
Olympic silver medalists in athletics (track and field)
Olympic gold medalists for Poland
Olympic silver medalists for Poland
Sportspeople from Silesian Voivodeship
World Athletics Championships athletes for Poland
World Athletics Championships medalists
Universiade medalists in athletics (track and field)
Universiade gold medalists for Poland
World Athletics Indoor Championships medalists
Competitors at the 2015 Summer Universiade
Medalists at the 2017 Summer Universiade
European Athletics Indoor Championships winners
20th-century Polish women
21st-century Polish women
European Athletics Championships winners